Narpatganj Assembly constituency is an assembly constituency in Araria district in the Indian state of Bihar. Jai Prakash Yadav (BJP), elected in 2020 is the MLA.

Overview
As per Delimitation of Parliamentary and Assembly constituencies Order, 2008, No 46 Narpatganj Assembly constituency is composed of the following: Narpatganj (community development block); Bhargama, Jainagar, Khajuri, Kushmaul, Manullahpatti, Paikpar, Raghunathpur North, Raghunathpur South, Rampur Aadi, Shankarpur, Simarbani, Sirsiya Hanumanganj and Sirsiya Kala of Bhargama (community development block).

Narpatganj Assembly constituency is part of No 9 Araria (Lok Sabha constituency) (SC).

Members of Legislative Assembly

Election results

2020

References

External links
 

Assembly constituencies of Bihar
Politics of Araria district